Plusia is a genus of moths of the family Noctuidae. The genus was erected by Ferdinand Ochsenheimer in 1816.

Description
Palpi upturned, where the second joint reaching vertex of head. Antennae of male ciliated. Thorax with a very large spreading tuft on the vertex. Abdomen with three large dorsal tufts on basal segments, and lateral and anal tufts more or less strongly developed in male. Forewings hooked at outer angle. Larva with two pairs of abdominal prolegs.

Species
 Plusia contexta Grote, 1873
 Plusia festucae Linnaeus, 1758 - gold spot
 Plusia magnimacula D. Handfield & L. Handfield, 2006
 Plusia manchurica Lempke, 1966
 Plusia nichollae Hampson, 1913
 Plusia putnami Grote, 1873
 Plusia rosanovi Nabokov, 1912
 Plusia venusta Walker, 1865

References
 
 
 

Plusiinae
Taxa named by Ferdinand Ochsenheimer